Pseudopostega concava is a moth of the family Opostegidae. It was described by Donald R. Davis and Jonas R. Stonis, 2007. It is known from a seasonally dry forest area in northeastern Mexico.

The length of the forewings is 2.8–3.7 mm. Adults have been recorded in August.

Etymology
The species name is derived from the Latin concavus (meaning arched inward, concave) in reference to the broadly concave anterior margin of the male vinculum.

References

Opostegidae
Moths described in 2007